A by-election for the seat of South-West Coast in the Victorian Legislative Assembly was held on 31 October 2015. The by-election was triggered by the resignation of former Premier Denis Napthine on 3 September 2015. Former Transport Minister Terry Mulder resigned his seat representing the adjacent district of Polwarth on the same day as Napthine. The by-election for Polwarth was held on the same day.

Candidates

The Labor government did not contest the by-elections in the safe Liberal seats of South-West Coast and Polwarth.

How-to-vote cards

How-to-vote cards are distributed to voters at polling stations to provide information with how the candidate suggests preferences be allocated. Candidates and parties suggesting preferences are shown in each column of the table below. Michael McCluskey ran an open card at this by-election.

Polling

Result

Roma Britnell retained the seat on preferences for the Liberals. Roy Reekie was second in the primary count.

See also
2015 Polwarth state by-election
List of Victorian state by-elections

References

External links
Victorian Electoral Commission: South-West Coast District by-election
ABC Elections: 2015 South-West Coast by-election

2015 elections in Australia
Victorian state by-elections
2010s in Victoria (Australia)